Tobias Karlsson (born 14 January 1989) is a Swedish footballer who plays for Falkenbergs FF as a defender.

References

External links

Soccerway

1989 births
Living people
Swedish footballers
Association football defenders
Torslanda IK players
Falkenbergs FF players
Allsvenskan players
Superettan players